Bælum is a  village in Denmark, 31 km from Aalborg with a population of 722 (1 January 2022). The village is a part of Rebild municipality.

It is located 5 km northeast of Terndrup and 16 km north of Hadsund. 

The Bælum Church is located in the city. In the northwest of the city is the Bælum Mill. The wind turbine and the motor house have been fully restored and are maintained by Bælum Møllelaug.

References

Cities and towns in the North Jutland Region
Rebild Municipality